The Schmidt Lithography Co. Clock Tower, built in San Francisco in 1921, was once headquarters to the Max Schmidt Lithography Company, once the largest printing company on the West Coast. The Clock Tower's building occupies two blocks at Second and Bryant Streets and was rumored to have once housed handball and volleyball courts, roof gardens, and a hospital for the Lithography Company.

The Clock Tower was built adjoining an older building on the property; the Lithography plant covered an area of 181 by 252 feet on Second Street. The Clock Tower stands at 170 feet tall.

The future of the tower was jeopardized by the building of the Bay Bridge Viaduct in the 1930s, but ultimately prevailed to stand in its original location of 461 Second Street, where it is located today. Because of the preservation and the tower's identifiable characteristics, it has become a landmark as the official "timepiece of Rincon hill".

Redevelopment
In 1993, the factory underwent a tremendous change when American Architect David Baker and McKenzie, Rose, and Halliday Development converted the tower and building into condominiums and commercial space. Today there are 127 residential units and several businesses, including the headquarters for Savant Investment Group. The entire conversion cost $33.6 million.

Awards
 Award of Merit for Residential Design Excellence, 1992.
 Design Excellence Award: Adaptive Use from the American Society of Interior Designers, 1993.

References

External links
SF-based Savant Investment Group opens Santa Rosa branch
Virtual Museum of the City of San Francisco

Buildings and structures in San Francisco